Andar ng mga Balita (lit. Movement of the News) is a Philippine news television program. It was the flagship newscast of AksyonTV. The newscast airs from Monday to Friday 11:00 a.m. to 12:00 n.n. local time. It is anchored by Martin Andanar and Chi Bocobo with reports from MJ Marfori, Danton Remoto and Seph Ubalde. The show was replaced by the second of four editions of Aksyon sa Tanghali.

History
The newscast was based on the morning radio newscast of the same title hosted by Andanar on Radyo5 92.3 News FM.
The program launched a weekend edition that aired on February 26–27, 2011 with Jove Francisco and Chi Bocobo as its co-anchors.  However, the weekend edition ended to be replaced by Balitang 60 on March 5, 2011.

On October 1, 2012, the newscast was moved to a new timeslot, which is 9:00 p.m.

On February 4, 2013, former beauty queen and lawyer Anna Theresa Licaros became part of the newscast as Andanar's new tandem, Licaros replaced Grace Lee as Andanar's tandem.

On June 3, 2013, the newscast moved to the daytime slot at 11:00 a.m. after Aksyon Solusyon as AksyonTV give way to its sports programming on primetime.

On Friday, July 11, 2014, Andar ng mga Balita aired its last broadcast reverting to Radyo5 92.3 News FM simulcast and as preparation to the launch of Aksyon sa Tanghali on July 21.

Background
Backed by the fastest-rising news organization in the country, News5, Martin Andanar and Anna Theresa Licaros deliver fast and factual news and information that headlined the day in Andar ng mga Balita, weekdays on AksyonTV Channel 41. Committed to its thrust of firebrand news delivery and public service, Andar ng mga Balita is AksyonTV's flagship newscast that brings the audience where the action is: the deeper story behind police reports, traffic and commuter updates for the public-on-the-rush and national stories delivered through augmented reality graphics from the all new Orad-based graphics engine.

Anchors

Final
 Martin Andanar (2011–2014)
 Chi Bocobo (2014)
 MJ Marfori (Celebrity Hot Stuff Anchor; 2011–2014)
 Joseph Ubalde (N5E Anchor; 2011–2014)
 Danton Remoto – Head, News Research (Remoto Control Anchor; 2013–2014)

Former
 Anna Theresa Licaros (2013–2014)
 Grace Lee (2012–2013)
 Benjie "TsongkiBenj" Felipe (2011–2013; Kasindak-sindak! segment anchor)
 Amelyn Veloso (sit in; moved to Solar News Channel)
 Maricel Halili (sit in)

Segments
 N5E – News found at News5.com.ph
 Police Reports
 Celebrity Hot Stuff
 Remoto Control
 Weather
 Sports

See also
News5
AksyonTV
Andar ng mga Balita (radio)
Balitang 60

References

External links

News5 shows
2011 Philippine television series debuts
2014 Philippine television series endings
AksyonTV original programming
Philippine television news shows
Flagship evening news shows